Bolbochasmops is a genus of trilobite in the order Phacopida, which existed in what is now Estonia. It was described by McNamara in 1980, and the type species is Bolbochasmops emarginata, which was originally described as Chasmops bucculenta, and later as Phacops bucculenta by Schmidt in 1881.

References

External links
 Bolbochasmops at the Paleobiology Database

Fossils of Estonia
Fossil taxa described in 1980
Pterygometopidae
Phacopida genera